The 37th South American Junior Championships in Athletics (Campeonatos Sudamericanos de Atletismo de Juveniles) were held
at the Estádio Ícaro de Castro Melo in São Paulo, Brazil from June
30-July 1, 2007.    The Champions for
men's 10,000m, both Race Walking and Combined Events were extracted from the
classification of the 2007 Pan American Junior Athletics Championships held at the
same site one week later from July 6 to July 8, 2007.
A detailed report on the results was given.  Best performances were the two South American Junior records by Alonso Edward from Panamá in 10.28s in the men's 100m competition, and Jorge McFarlane from Perú who achieved 13.76s (0.0 m/s) in the first heat in 110m hurdles men.

Participation (unofficial)

Detailed result lists can be found on the CBAt website, and on the "World Junior Athletics History"
website. An unofficial count yields the number of about 224
athletes from about 12 countries: Argentina (20), Bolivia (3), Brazil (72),
Chile (34), Colombia (28), Ecuador (17), Guyana (3), Panama (3), Paraguay (9),
Peru (10), Uruguay (2), Venezuela (23).

Medal summary
Medal winners are published on the CACAC website, on the IAAF website
Complete results can be found on the CBAt website, on a session by session base
and on the "World Junior Athletics History"
website.

Men

Women

Medal table (unofficial)

The medal count was published.

Team trophies

The placing tables for team trophy (overall team, men and women categories) were published.

Total

Male

Female

Individual

The trophies for the most outstanding performance were awarded to Juan Pablo Maturana (Colombia), gold medalist in the men's 400m, 400m hurdles,
and 4 × 100 m relay events, and to Giselle Marcolino de Albuquerque (Brazil),
gold medalist in the women's 100m hurdles and triple jump events.

References

External links
World Junior Athletics History

South American U20 Championships in Athletics
2007 in Brazilian sport
South American U20
International sports competitions in São Paulo
International athletics competitions hosted by Brazil
2007 in youth sport